Corymbia disjuncta is a species of tree that is endemic in northern Australia. It has rough bark on some or all of the trunk, then a clear separation to smooth bark, a crown of intermediate and adult, heart-shaped to egg-shaped leaves, flower buds mostly in groups of seven, creamy white flowers and cylindrical to barrel-shaped or urn-shaped fruit.

Description
It has rough, tessellated greyish bark on part or all of the trunk, abruptly separated from the smooth white to pale grey bark above. The tree loses its leaves in the dry season and the flowers develop on bare branches, just below the new season's growth. Flowering occurs from August to November and the flowers are creamy white.

Taxonomy and naming
Corymbia disjuncta was first formally described in 1995 by Ken Hill and Lawrie Johnson from specimens collected by John D. Briggs on the road to Stapleton in the Northern Territory in 1983.

Distribution and habitat
This eucalypt has a disjunct distribution from the northern Kimberley region of Western Australia to northern lowland areas and off-shore islands of the Northern Territory, and the northern Cape York Peninsula of Queensland. It is also found in southern parts of Papua New Guinea. It grows in shallow soils over basalt and sandstone.

See also
 List of Corymbia species

References

disjuncta
Myrtales of Australia
Rosids of Western Australia
Flora of the Northern Territory
Flora of Queensland
Flora of New Guinea
Plants described in 1995